The Edwin L. Cox School of Business is an American business school, part of Southern Methodist University (SMU) in Dallas, Texas. The SMU Cox School of Business is headquartered in four buildings on SMU's 210-acre main campus five miles north of downtown Dallas and has a second campus in Plano, Texas.  

Led by Dean Matthew Myers, SMU Cox offers a full range of business education programs, including BBA, full-time MBA, MBA Professional (Part-Time), Executive MBA, Master of Science in Management, Master of Science in Business Analytics and non-degree Executive Education. It is home to the Caruth Institute for Entrepreneurship, Business Leadership Center (BLC), Maguire Energy Institute, and American Airlines Global Leadership Program (AAGLP) as well as an Associate Board Executive Mentoring Program. It has an international alumni network with chapters in more than twenty countries.

Its largest program is its full-time MBA.  It has consistently ranked among the top business schools worldwide for MBA, PMBA, EMBA and BBA in a wide range of categories. The Cox School is accredited by the Association to Advance Collegiate Schools of Business (AACSB).

Faculty and research papers
 Faculty research – a selection of the research and working papers issued by the Cox faculty
 Academic Departments – a listing of all of the academic departments
 Media–friendly Experts Guide – a listing of various areas of expertise for the media

Notable SMU Cox alumni

 Gabriel Barbier-Mueller – Founder and CEO, Harwood International
 Betsy Boze (MBA) – CEO and Dean, Kent State University Stark Campus
 Deborah Coonts – American novelist and lawyer 
 Robert H. Dedman, Jr. – President and CEO, ClubCorp
 Robert H. Dedman, Sr. – Founder and CEO, ClubCorp
 David B. Dillon – President and chairman, The Kroger Co.
 Bob Dudley, BP executive in charge of Deepwater Horizon oil spill
 J. Lindsay Embrey – chairman and CEO, First Continental Enterprises Inc., and Embrey Enterprises Inc.
 Gerald J. Ford – Dallas-based billionaire
 Aart J. de Geus – Co-founder, chairman and CEO, Synopsys
 Art Greenhaw – Founder and producer, Art Greenhaw Records, Grammy Award-Winning record label
 Donald Holmquest – CEO, California RHIO
 Thomas W. Horton (MBA 1985) – Chairman of AMR and American Airlines
 Clark Hunt – chairman of the board of the National Football League's Kansas City Chiefs and a founding investor-owner in Major League Soccer
 Clark Hunt – chairman of the board and a founding investor-owner in Major League Soccer
 Lamar Hunt – Founder of the American Football League and owner of the Kansas City Chiefs
 Helen LaKelly Hunt – Founder of The Sister Fund
 Ray Lee Hunt – chairman and CEO, Hunt Oil Company
 Harold MacDowell – CEO, TDIndustries
 John H. Matthews
 Blake Mycoskie – founder of TOMS Shoes
 Robert Mosbacher, Jr. – Houston businessman, President, Mosbacher Energy Company, Overseas Private Investment Corporation
 Erle A. Nye – chairman and CEO, TXU
 William J. O'Neil – Founder of the business newspaper Investors Business Daily
Eckhard Pfeiffer (MBA) – former CEO of Compaq
Edward B. Rust Jr. (MBA) – chairman of the board and chief executive officer of State Farm Mutual Automobile Insurance Company
 Mark Shepherd – chairman and CEO, Texas Instruments
Jeffrey Skilling – Former chairman and CEO of Enron.
 John Tyson (businessman) – chairman, Tyson Foods and grandson of John W. Tyson, Founder of Tyson Foods

See also
List of United States business school rankings
List of business schools in the United States

References

Southern Methodist University colleges and schools
Business schools in Texas
Educational institutions established in 1920
1920 establishments in Texas